Derol or Dedol is a village in the Sabarkantha district of Gujarat, in western India.

History 
Derol was a Sixth Class princely state, including a second village in Mahi Kantha Agency and ruled by Koli chieftains.

It had a combined population of 837 in 1901, yielding a state revenue of 1,823 Rupees (1903–1904, mostly from land), paying tributes of 513 Rupees to the Gaikwar Baroda State and 47 Rupees to Idar State.

Geography and transportation 
 The village's small Derol railway station connects it to Kalol, which lies on the main trunk road State Highway-5. It is connected to Godhra, 27 km to the north, and Halol (13 km) and Vadodara (50 km) to the south.
 Apart from the highway, it is connected to adjacent villages through a network of country roads. Most of the country roads are paved, single-lane and reasonably maintained. A portion of the route between Kalol and Vadodara is a toll road.

See also 
 Vaghela Derol, nearby village

External links and sources 
History
 Imperial Gazetteer on DSAL - Mahi Kantha

Footnotes

Villages in Sabarkantha district
Princely states of Gujarat